English Qaballa (EQ) is an English Qabalah, supported by a system of arithmancy that interprets the letters of the English alphabet via an assigned set of values, discovered by James Lees in 1976. It is the result of an intent to understand, interpret, and elaborate on the mysteries of Aleister Crowley's received text, Liber AL vel Legis, the Book of the Law. According to Jake Stratton-Kent, "the English Qaballa is a qabalah and not a system of numerology. A qabalah is specifically related to three factors: one, a language; two, a 'holy' text or texts; three, mathematical laws at work in these two."

This system has also been referred to as the ALW cipher, New Aeon English Qabalah or NAEQ by third parties (see Other names section).

Background
The first appearance of a system of gematria using the natural order of the English alphabet was developed in 1532 by Michael Stifel, who also proposed a system called the trigonal alphabet, using successive triangular numbers. Another early system of English gematria was used by poet John Skelton. An analogue of the Greek system of isopsephy using the Latin alphabet appeared in 1583. Other variations appeared in 1683 (simply referred to as the 1683 alphabet, this system was used by Leo Tolstoy in War and Peace to identify Napoleon with the number of the Beast) and 1707 (Alphabetum Cabbalisticum Vulgare). These and other variations are detailed in Underwood Dudley's Numerology, Or, What Pythagoras Wrought.

In 1904, Aleister Crowley wrote out the text of the foundational document of his world-view, known as Liber AL vel Legis, The Book of the Law. In this text was the injunction found at verse 2:55; "Thou shalt obtain the order & value of the English Alphabet, thou shalt find new symbols to attribute them unto" which was understood by Crowley as referring to an English Qabalah yet to be developed or revealed.

Order and value
The "order & value" discovered by James Lees lays the letters out on the grid superimposed on the page of manuscript of Liber AL on which this verse (Ch. III, v. 47) appears (sheet 16 of Chapter III). Also appearing on this page are a diagonal line and a circled cross. The Book of the Law states that the book should only be printed with Crowley's hand-written version included, suggesting that there are mysteries in the "chance shape of the letters and their position to one another" of Crowley's handwriting.  Whichever top-left to bottom-right diagonal is read the magickal order of the letters is obtained. As there are ten squares per column, this method is equivalent to taking every eleventh letter of the alphabet as the order and then assigning them sequential values:

Methods

Calculation and comparison
The first method of English Qaballa is simple arithmancy with a numerical dictionary. For example, the value of the word 'Jesus' is 68; other words with this value are 'life' and 'change'. The meaning of these 'word collisions' must be determined by the individual qaballist.

Initial and final letters
The second method is to calculate the value of the first letters of a phrase or sentence, and also the value of the last letters of the phrase. As with the first method, the resulting values are then looked up and utilized in the same manner. This analysis is intended to indicate how a process indicated by the phrase will begin and how it will end.

Reversal yields the reward
The third method is reversing the digits in the value of a word. This method is based on Liber AL III:1 "Abrahadabra! The reward of Ra Hoor Khut." In this example, 'Ra Hoor Khu' sums to 97, and 'Abrahadabra' sums to 79. Thus the verse provides its own example of how the reward may be calculated.

Counting well
The method of 'counting well' involves two words and is represented by the symbol '%'. To 'count well' the value of two words is to multiply the value of the first word by the number of letters in the second word and vice versa, then sum the two values thus obtained. Thus 'Jesus % Christ' yields (68 x 6) + (81 x 5) = 408 + 405 = 813. As with the first method, the resulting value is then looked up and interpreted in a similar manner.

Other methods
A fourth method involves summing the word progressively (e.g. 'word' yields 'w' = 3, 'wo' = 10, 'wor' = 22, and 'word' = 28). These successive values are then interpreted as a sequence which may elucidate the meaning of the word. A fifth method is to divide word into two or more parts, then sum each part separately, again producing a sequence of numbers to be interpreted. The sixth method is to replace a word with other words of the same value in a sentence or verse in order to clarify the meaning of the word in that specific context.

History

Initial discovery
The first report of the system known as English Qaballa (EQ) was published in 1979 by Ray Sherwin in an editorial in the final issue of his journal, The New Equinox. In his editorial, Sherwin reported that the "order & value of the English Alphabet" had been discovered by an English magician, James Lees, in November 1976. Lees subsequently assumed the role of publisher of The New Equinox and, starting in 1981, published additional material about the EQ system over the course of five issues of the journal, extending into 1982. The first software designed to perform textual analysis of Liber AL and the other Holy Books of Thelema was written in 1984-5 by Trevor Langford. Langford subsequently worked with Jake Stratton-Kent on The Equinox: British Journal of Thelema, in which further original material on EQ was summarized by Stratton-Kent in the March 1988 issue.

Solution to Liber AL II:76
Early on, Jim Lees also discovered the first proof of the system. In the original handwritten text, the string of letters and numbers in the 76th verse of the second chapter is divided into two lines, the first ending with "Y" and the second beginning with "X". Jake Stratton-Kent thought that in the manuscript the 'X' at the beginning of line two looked like a multiplication symbol, so he added each line's values together and multiplied them; 17x11=187, the numerical value of the phrase "English alphabet", which he felt confirmed the correctness of the system.

In 1988, Stratton-Kent described his discovery of this solution. He wrote:

In the original handwritten text, the string of letters and numbers is divided into two lines, the first ending with "Y" and the second beginning with "X". Stratton-Kent says,

Other names
Well subsequent to the original discovery and publication of the English Qaballa (EQ), several self-published authors appropriated and rebranded the system. In 1994, Allen H. Greenfield referred to the system as the "ALW cipher" in his self-published book, Secret Cipher of the UFOnauts (Illuminet Press, 1994; Lulu.com, 2006). In 2003, Gerald Del Campo also presented the same system, referring to it as a "New Aeon English Qabalah" or "NAEQ" in his book, New Aeon English Qabalah Revealed. In 2004, John L. Crow also referred to the system using the same nomenclature in a book published under the same imprint, The New Aeon English Qabalah Dictionary.

21st century
Little, if any, further material on English Qaballa was published until the appearance of Jake Stratton-Kent's book, The Serpent Tongue: Liber 187, in 2011. This was followed in 2016 by The Magickal Language of the Book of the Law: An English Qaballa Primer by Cath Thompson. An account of the discovery, exploration, and continuing research and development of the system up to 2010, by James Lees and members of his group in England, is detailed in her 2018 book, All This and a Book.

Reception
In 2020, Lon Milo DuQuette wrote "... as an individual, I cannot hide my personal enthusiasm concerning the English Qaballa [...] and marvelous work being done by Jake Stratton-Kent and others who are continuing to develop and enrich it. They deserve the admiration and thanks of every student of modern magick."

See also
 Astrotheology
 Ceremonial magic
 Gematria
 Isopsephy
 Magical formula
 Numerology

References

Citations

Works cited

 
 .
 
 
 .

Further reading

External links
 Thelema Now! Guest: Cath Thompson - discusses EQ in this podcast
 "History of Ciphers" (part 4a) - The Thelemic Ciphers (I)
 Online EQ summation and lookup tool

Ceremonial magic
Hermetic Qabalah
Kabbalah
Practical Kabbalah
Thelema
Western esotericism